The Anthem of Bogotá is the musical composition that symbolizes the Colombia's capital city. It was officially adopted through the decree 1000 of July 31, 1974.

History
The anthem's lyrics were written by the poet Pedro Medina Avendaño and the music was composed by the musician Roberto Pineda Duque. The anthem was selected through a public concourse announced following the agreement 71 of 9 September 1967, whose judge was named by the decree number 731 of 3 July 1974 and the prize was 50.000 pesos. The judges of the concourse selected this song on 31 July 1974 and the mayor Anibal Fernandez de Soto signed the decree that declared the song as the official anthem of the city. Its debut was on 7 August 1974 in a concert made in the Jorge Eliecer Gaitan Theater.
The agreement 1 of April 19, 1988, fixes the rules for the use of the symbols of the city of Bogotá, the decree 120 of March 14, 1991, obligates the citizens to teach the symbols of the city in the educative centers and also to intone the anthem at every public event within the city. Finally the decree 64 of February 12 of 1993 requests every educative establishment to raise the city's flag weekly along with the intonation of the anthem. Since the declaration of this decree, some football fans intone the anthem on every sport event, something that helps to promote the learning of the anthem among the youth of the city.

Lyrics

External links
 

Anthems of Colombian cities
Bogotá
Colombian culture
Spanish-language songs